Fleming Island High School (FIHS) is a public senior high school located in Fleming Island, Florida and is part of the Clay County School District. The school opened in 2003 and has an enrollment of approximately 2,000 students. The team name is the Golden Eagles and the school colors are green and gold. In 2013 FIHS made U.S. News & World Reports list of Best  High Schools.

Notable alumni
 Ian Silberman - offensive guard who is currently a free agent.
 Zane Comer - creative director

References

External links
Fleming Island High School
Fleming Island High School Athletics
Fleming Island High School Golden Eagle Band

Schools in Clay County, Florida
Public high schools in Florida